Eastleigh Athletic were a long-running works football club, based in Eastleigh, Hampshire. They were one of the early pioneers of football in the area and were the main team in the town until the loss of their ground and the emergence of other local sides.

History
The Eastleigh Railway Depot was opened by the London & South Western Railway Company in 1891 and shortly afterwards workers formed a football team, initially known as Eastleigh LSWR. 

The company owned their own sports ground at Dutton Lane in the town, which over the years was developed with an oval cycling track and grandstand for spectators.

In 1896 the club adopted their best known identity of Eastleigh Athletic and were one of the eight founder members of the Hampshire League. On 5 September 1896 they took part in an historic match against Freemantle - the first ever game of the new competition. On a glorious sunny afternoon, the two teams provided plenty of entertainment for the large crowd with the match receiving full coverage from the Hants & Dorset press. Eastleigh narrowly lost that day 4-5 and fielded the following team: Collins, Dexter, Brocklehurst, Silverman, Bull, Service, Jeffcote, Bastock, Woodhouse, Knox and Sharp. Eastleigh finished the season in 4th place.

During the course of the AGM on 26 July 1897, it was mentioned by the Assistant Hon. Secretary, William Powley, that the colours of the club would be changed to chocolate and blue. This decision was to prove inspirational as in 1897–98, they were league champions and Hampshire Senior Cup winners, after a 2–1 victory against the 2nd Gordon Highlanders (Aldershot). The final was played at the County Ground, Southampton in front of a large crowd.

In order to generate a full fixture list, in those days it was not uncommon for clubs to enter more than one league during the same season and in 1897–98 Eastleigh also entered a side in the Western League (Professional Section). Also playing in this eight-team Division were Swindon Town, Reading, Bristol City and Eastville (now Bristol Rovers) - Eastleigh finished in 7th place. The following season they then joined the Southern League Division 2 (South West Section), finishing 5th out of six clubs, but on the scrapping of this short-lived division the main focus switched back to the more realistic Hampshire League.

In 1903 the league was divided into regional sections with Eastleigh placed in the South Division where they consolidated, however, they still maintained a strong cup pedigree. Eastleigh Athletic were regular entrants in the national competitions and in 1902–03 enjoyed their best run in the FA Cup when they reached the 4th Qualifying Round, losing 1–3 away to Whiteheads, the Dorset League champions.

1908–09 was another milestone season, when the Southampton FA was formed with Eastleigh becoming founder members, and entering Reserve sides in the Associations' newly formed league. There was further cup glory when they recorded a fine double by again winning the Hampshire Senior Cup after a 2–0 victory against the 2nd Cameron Highlanders (Tidworth) and also the inaugural Southampton Senior Cup after a 2–0 victory over Bitterne Guild (both games were played at The Dell, Southampton). 

The 1910–11 season saw the 'Railwaymen' reach another two finals; the Hampshire Senior Cup was won for the third and final time after a 4–2 success against Kings Royal Rifles Corps (Gosport) at Fratton Park, Portsmouth  but they were denied another double after losing the Southampton Senior Cup final 0–3 (in a replay) against Bitterne Guild, who gained revenge for their defeat two years previously.

During these halcyon days, a number of former professional players worked at the site and also played for the team. These included Tommy Bowman, Samuel Meston, Bert Paddington, Baven Penton and Joe Turner, whilst Richard Brookes began his career here before moving on to greater things. 

The club closed down for the Great War (1914-18) but reformed once peace resumed and the early twenties saw them reach another two Southampton Senior Cup finals and yo-yo between the county league's two divisions, winning the West Division title in 1922–23. In 1925, after a poor season, they opted to join the less demanding Southampton League, where they soon found their feet again as they consecutively won the Junior 3, Junior 2 and South Hants Division titles during the final three seasons of the decade.   

In 1930 the club returned to the Hampshire League Division 2 under the name of SR Eastleigh Athletic (S.R. stood for Southern Railway, the new owners of the locomotive works in Eastleigh) and the team soon re-established themselves as they pushed for promotion. After several near misses they were champions in 1938–39 only to have their progress halted by the outbreak of World War II. 

In 1947 Eastleigh again returned to the county League when they were placed in Division 3 East and when British Rail took over the works two years later their name was amended to BR Eastleigh Athletic. Until this point they had been the town's senior club, but the post war era saw the emergence of local rivals Pirelli General, Eastleigh Spartans and Swaythling Athletic in the Hampshire League and this saw increased competition for the area's best players. 

Disaster struck soon after when they lost their ground after the Railway Goods Yard was expanded and after this, the club endured a somewhat nomadic life for the remainder of their existence. They initially ground shared with local rivals Ford Sports in Swaythling before obtaining the use of a pitch at Chickenhall Lane, Bishopstoke and after several steady seasons they won promotion in 1956–57 as Division 3 runners-up.

Another enforced move saw them back in Eastleigh, using Fleming Park (a council owned sports centre still used today) for home games, but despite some steady performances, they had to leave the competition in 1961 due to the venue's inadequate facilities. A year later they were re-admitted back after agreeing a groundshare with league rivals BTC Southampton at nearby Stoneham Lane. They were placed in Division 3 but things were never quite the same and after several seasons of struggle they were relegated in 1964–65 after finishing bottom. Their fortunes did not improve back in the Southampton League and BR sadly folded early during the 1966–67 campaign. 

After several years inactivity, the club reappeared under the guise of B.R.S.A. (British Rail Staff Association) and again ran teams in the now defunct Eastleigh & District League (1905-91) and the lower junior divisions of the Southampton League, where they enjoyed moderate success before finally calling it a day in 1977.

In later years there were Youth teams playing under the same identity and a team called Eastleigh Locomotive but neither are thought to be connected.

Honours

Hampshire League
Champions 1897/98
Hampshire League Division 2
Champions 1938/39
Runners-up 1931/32
Hampshire League Division 3
Runners-up 1956/57
Hampshire League West Division
Champions 1922/23
Hampshire League South Division
Runners-up 1919/20
Southampton League Junior Division 2
Champions 1927/28
Southampton League Junior Division 3
Champions 1926/27
Southampton League South Hants Division
Champions 1928/29
Hampshire FA Senior Cup 
Winners 1897/98, 1908/09 and 10/11 
Southampton FA Senior Cup
Winners 1908/09
Finalists 1910/11, 19/20 and 22/23
Hampshire FA Junior 'A' Cup 
Winners 1932/33 (Reserves)
Southampton FA Junior 'A' Cup
Winners 1929/30 (Reserves)
Southampton FA Junior Consolation Cup
Winners 1929/30 (Reserves)

Playing Records

League

FA Cup

References

Defunct football clubs in England
Defunct football clubs in Hampshire
Eastleigh
Southern Football League clubs
Association football clubs disestablished in 1967
1977 disestablishments in England
Association football clubs established in the 19th century